Sundström is a Swedish surname, a compound of the Swedish words sund (sound; passage of water) ström (stream and/or stream in water)

Geographical distribution
As of 2014, 79.2% of all known bearers of the surname Sundström were residents of Sweden (frequency 1:1,192) and 19.5% of Finland (1:2,697).

In Sweden, the frequency of the surname was higher than national average (1:1,192) in the following counties:
 1. Norrbotten County (1:244)
 2. Västernorrland County (1:356)
 3. Västerbotten County (1:424)
 4. Jämtland County (1:654)
 5. Gävleborg County (1:761)
 6. Dalarna County (1:784)
 7. Södermanland County (1:881)
 8. Uppsala County (1:918)
 9. Örebro County (1:1,026)
 10. Västmanland County (1:1,099)
 11. Värmland County (1:1,119)

In Finland, the frequency of the surname was higher than national average (1:2,697) in the following regions:
 1. Åland (1:263)
 2. Ostrobothnia (1:619)
 3. Uusimaa (1:1,416)
 4. Central Ostrobothnia (1:1,423)
 5. Southwest Finland (1:2,030)

People
Anna Sundström (1785-1871), chemist
Alexander Sundström (born 1987), ice hockey player
Fanny Sundström (1883–1944), politician and women's right activist
Henrik Sundström (born 1964), tennis player
Holger Sundström (born 1925), sailor
Joakim Sundström (born 1965), sound editor and musician
Kalle Sundström, Finnish musician
Linus Sundström (born 1990), speedway rider
Liselotte Sundström (born 1955), evolutionary biologist
Niklas Sundström (born 1975), ice hockey player
Patrik Sundström (born 1961), ice hockey player, twin brother of Peter Sundström
Patrik Sundström (footballer) (born 1970), footballer
Peter Sundström (born 1961), ice hockey player, twin brother of Patrik Sundström
Rebecca Louisa Ferguson Sundström (born 1983), actress
Stefan Sundström (born 1960), singer/songwriter
Tryggve Sundström (1920-1984), bobsledder
Pär Sundström (born 1981), bassist

References

Swedish-language surnames